Friendship is a studio album by Lee Ritenour released in 1978. This album was his third out of fourth to be recorded direct to a master disc, with each side of the LP one continuous performance.

Track listing
"Sea Dance" (Don Grusin)
"Crystal Morning" (Lee Ritenour)
"Samurai Night Fever" (Dave Grusin)
"Life is the Song We Sing" (Ernie Watts)
"Woody Creek" (Dave Grusin)
"It's a Natural Thing" (Watts)

Musicians
Steve Forman - percussion
Steve Gadd - drums
Dave Green - synthesizer
Dave Grusin - piano, electric piano
Don Grusin - electric piano
Abraham Laboriel - bass, electric bass
Lee Ritenour - guitar, acoustic guitar, electric guitar, synthesizer, vocals
Ernie Watts - soprano saxophone, tenor saxophone, saxophone

References 

1978 albums
Lee Ritenour albums